Thomas Francis Duffy (born November 9, 1955) is an American actor. He has appeared as the sadistic rapist Charles Wilson in Death Wish II, the paleontologist Dr. Robert Burke in The Lost World: Jurassic Park, and as the football-loving dad in Varsity Blues.

Early life
Thomas was born in Newark, New Jersey, and was raised in Woodbridge, New Jersey. While attending Woodbridge High School, he played football, ice hockey, tennis, and track and was active in drama and vocal music. He was originally a pre-law student at Ohio University, where he also played football and ice hockey. Duffy auditioned for an opera, was cast, and finally graduated with a BFA in acting. He was a member of Ohio's 1979 MCHL championship hockey team. He also was selected for the 1979 summer company of the Monomoy Theater, in Chatham, Massachusetts, on Cape Cod.

1980s
Thomas arrived in Hollywood in 1980, and was cast in an episode of CHiPs, which he never filmed, because the next day he was set to co-star as Dave Christian, a member of the 1980 gold medal Olympic hockey team in Miracle on Ice, a mini-series. Duffy made his feature film debut as Nirvana, Charles Bronson's chief nemesis in Death Wish II. He went on to appear in such films as To Live and Die in L.A., The Abyss, Crossroads and State of Grace and guest starred on Night Court, The Fall Guy, The Twilight Zone, MacGyver, and recurred on A Year in the Life on television.

Career
Duffy appeared in the 1992 film The Waterdance, an acclaimed but oft overlooked feature that won the 1992 Sundance Festival Audience award and the 1993 Independent Spirit Best Picture award, with good friend, William Forsythe.

Duffy played Dr. Robert Burke in Steven Spielberg's 1997 blockbuster, The Lost World: Jurassic Park. He prepared for the role by watching Dr. Robert Bakker and traveled to Wyoming to work on a dig with Bakker.

In 1999, Duffy played Sam Moxon in Varsity Blues, a film about Texas high school football. Duffy was almost killed when his car was struck by a hit-and-run driver, while filming in Austin, Texas.

Other films Duffy completed in the 1990s were Independence Day, Mercury Rising, Poodle Springs, The Fan, The River Wild, Wolf, Out for Justice, The Mambo Kings and Let the Devil Wear Black.

He guest starred on The X-Files as Jeffrey Cahn in episode "Alpha", Tales From the Crypt, NYPD Blue, High Incident, The Magnificent Seven, Chicago Hope, Matlock, Chicken Soup for the Soul, TV movies, If Looks Could Kill, Nothing Lasts Forever and White Dwarf and recurring roles on Picket Fences, Days of Our Lives, and In Living Color.

Personal life
His father, Peter T. Duffy, was killed by a drunk driver in his hometown of Woodbridge, New Jersey, in 1992. Thomas was filming The Mambo Kings at the time, and the producers cut a scene so he could return home. His youngest sister, Patricia, was also killed by a drunk driver in Woodbridge, in 1990.

Thomas was filming Wagons East! in 1994 with John Candy in Durango, Mexico, when John died from a heart attack.

2000s
Thomas appeared in the features Scorcher, The Standard, and World Trade Center for Oliver Stone. Thomas appeared in two roles in WTC, as the Command Center cop, and as the Ground Zero fireman who pulls John McLoughlin (Nicolas Cage) from the rubble.

Guest starring television appearances included Without a Trace, ER and G vs E, recurring roles on Cover Me: Based on the True Life of an FBI Family, The Agency, and Family Law.

2010s

Thomas appears in the film Rubber, which opened in the US in 2011 from Magnet Releasing. Rubber is a 2010 French horror comedy film about a tire that comes to life and kills people with its psychic powers. It was directed and written by Quentin Dupieux. The film premiered at the 2010 Cannes Film Festival.

Duffy was seen in the Paramount feature Super 8, directed by filmmaker J. J. Abrams, produced by Steven Spielberg, and released on June 10, 2011, in both conventional and IMAX 3D theatres.

On television, Thomas is recurring on the hit ABC comedy series The Middle as Jack Meenahan, the Hecks neighbor. He also guest starred on Law & Order: Los Angeles, and the Showtime pilot Shameless.

In 2010, Thomas plays the role of executive Whitman Hayes in the film The Candidate, to be released in 2011.

Filmography

 Miracle on Ice (1981, TV Movie) as Dave Christian
 CHiPs (1981, TV) as Nick
 Today's FBI (1981, TV) as Bob Tenner
 Death Wish II (1982) as Charles 'Nirvana' Wilson
 The Fall Guy (1982, TV) as Pump Jockey
 T.J. Hooker (1982, TV) as Morgan
 Baby Sister (1983) as Michael Fancher
 Whiz Kids (1984, TV) as Carter
 Getting Physical (1984, TV Movie) as Killer
 Space (1985, TV Movie) as Brad
 Command 5 (1985, TV Movie) as Lew
 To Live and Die in L.A. (1985) as Credit Card Counterfeiter
 The Twilight Zone (1985, TV) as Businessman (segment "Night of the Meek")
 The Last Precinct (1986, TV) as Harvey
 Casebusters (1986, TV)
 Divorce Court (1986, TV)
 Outlaws (1987, TV) as Gil
 MacGyver (1987, TV) as Corey
 A Year in the Life (1988, TV) as Ross
 Night Court (1989, TV) as Dale Coderko
 Danger Zone II (1989) as Dumptser
 The Abyss (1989) as Construction Worker
 Nasty Boys (1990, TV)
 State of Grace (1990) as Frankie's Man
 Almost an Angel (1990) (uncredited)
 Out for Justice (1991) as O'Kelly
 My Life and Times (1991, TV) as Josh Kincaid
 Guilty as Charged (1991) as Evans
 Matlock (1991, TV) as Bartender
 The Waterdance (1992) as Dr. Harrison
 Two-Fisted Tales (1992, TV Movie) as Scorby (segment "Showdown")
 The Mambo Kings (1992) as Mulligan
 Tales from the Crypt (1992, TV) as Deputy Wilson
 To Protect and Serve (1992) as Stewart
 In Living Color (1992–1993, TV recurring) as Officer Murphy / Senator Watson
 Eye of the Stranger (1993) as Ballack
 Picket Fences (1994, TV) as Deputy Tully
 Wolf (1994) as Tom
 Wagons East! (1994) as Clayton Ferguson
 The River Wild (1994) as Ranger
 White Dwarf (1995, TV Movie) as Fisherman with Parasite
 Chicago Hope (1995, TV) as Ralph King
 Nothing Lasts Forever (1995, TV Movie) as Bill Lomax 
 If Looks Could Kill (1996, TV Movie) as Officer Bryant (uncredited)
 Independence Day (1996) as Lieutenant
 The Fan (1996) as Figgy 
 High Incident (1997, TV Series) as Billy
 The Lost World: Jurassic Park (1997) as Dr. Robert Burke
 Mercury Rising (1998) as Audey (uncredited)
 Poodle Springs (1998, TV) as Fat Cop
 Let the Devil Wear Black (1999) as Bartender 
 NYPD Blue (1999, TV) as Vic's Killer
 Varsity Blues (1999) as Sam Moxon
 The X-Files (1999, TV) as Jeffrey Cahn
 The Magnificent Seven (1999, TV) as Johnson
 Chicken Soup for the Soul (1999, TV) as Paul
 Runaway Virus (2000, TV Movie) as Coyote 
 G vs E (2000, TV) as Mr. Burly
 Cover Me: Based on the True Life of an FBI Family (2000, TV) as FBI Superintendent Coswell
 Family Law (2001, TV) as Carl Layton
 Scorcher (2002) as Anderson
 ER (2002, TV) as Detective Henderson
 The Agency (2003, TV) as Chief of Station Cruz
 The Drone Virus (2004) as Russell Wheeler
 Gone But Not Forgotten (2005, TV Movie) as Chief O'Malley
 Without a Trace (2005, TV) as Bob
 The Standard (2006) as Dylan's Father
 World Trade Center (2006) as NYC Command Centre Operator
 Funniest Commercials of the Year:2008 (2008, TV Movie) as Chainsaw Man
 The Middle (2009-2011) as Jack Meenahan
 Rubber (2010) as Cop Xavier
 Law & Order: Los Angeles (2010, TV) as Mel Wilcox
 The Candidate (2010, Short) as Whitman Hayes
 Shameless (2011, TV) as Tommy
 Super 8 (2011) as Rooney
 Supremacy (2014) as Deputy Lansing

References

External links

Duffy at Film Reference.com
Duffy at Encyclopedia.com

1955 births
Male actors from Newark, New Jersey
American male film actors
American male television actors
Living people
Ohio University alumni
Writers from Newark, New Jersey
People from Woodbridge Township, New Jersey
Woodbridge High School (New Jersey) alumni
20th-century American male actors
21st-century American male actors